The following are the summary of the episodes of Pinoy Big Brother: Kumunity Season 10 which began airing on Kapamilya Channel, Jeepney TV and A2Z on October 16, 2021. 

The show had already broadcast 225 episodes during the season's entire run.

Celebrity
Note that Day 1 started on October 16 upon the entry of the celebrity housemates. Note also that the events in the House, as broadcast in the show, does not truly reflect the exact day when these events had really transpired as the show had based them on the episode counts. All the days mentioned in these summary are based on the live feed of the show via Kumu and not from the said episode count of the show.

Week 1

Week 2

Week 3

Week 4

Week 5

Week 6

Week 7

Week 8

Week 9

Week 10

Week 11

Adult

Week 12

Week 13

Week 14

Week 15

Week 16

Week 17

Week 18

Week 20

Week 21

Week 22

Teen

Week 23

Week 24

Week 25

Week 26

Week 27

Week 28

Week 29

Week 30

Week 31

Biga-10

Week 32

Week 33

Big Homecoming
Two-part special post-season episodes are aired since the week after the Big Night where the Final Five of all three Kumunities are reunited inside the house for a conversation with hosts Bianca and Robi to relive the experiences and address the controversies that occurred during their time in the recently-concluded season. In addition, some of this season's hosts portray some of this season's highlights in the "Uber-Acting" segment.

References

External links
 Pinoy Big Brother: Kumunity Season 10 — Official website

Pinoy Big Brother
2021 Philippine television seasons